Newgrounds is an entertainment website and company founded by Tom Fulp in 1995. It hosts user-generated content such as games, films, audio, and artwork. Fulp produces in-house content at the headquarters and offices in Glenside, Pennsylvania.

In the 2000s and 2010s, Newgrounds played an important role in Internet culture, and in Internet animation and independent video gaming in particular. It has been called a "distinct time in gaming history", a place "where many animators and developers cut their teeth and gained a following long before social media was even a thing", and "a haven for fostering the greats of internet animation".

Content

User-generated content can be uploaded and categorized into either one of the site's four web portals: Games, Movies, Audio, and Art. A Movie or Games submission entered undergoes the process termed "judgment", where it can be rated by all users (from 0 to 5 stars) and reviewed by other users. The average score calculated at various points during judgment determines if whether the content will be "saved" (added onto the database) or "blammed" (deleted with only its reviews saved in the "Obituaries" section). 

Since Adobe Flash Player was shut down on most current browsers by late 2020, Newgrounds uses the Ruffle emulator, an Adobe Flash emulator written in Rust and is sponsored by Newgrounds along with other popular sites like Cool Math Games and Armor Games for content created with Flash. As of 2022, Ruffle only supported a select few number of Flash projects written in ActionScript 3.0 which meant users had to download the "Newgrounds Player", the site's own Flash emulator which it used prior to Ruffle, to run projects written in AS3.

Art and Audio are processed using a different method called "scouting", which the site describes as "a way to vet users and weed out spam, stolen works, low quality submissions, etc." All users can put art and audio onto their own page, but only those that are "scouted" will appear in the public area. Like the judgment system, it stops stolen content, spam, or prohibited material reaching the public area, relying on users and site moderators. Once an individual is scouted, they are given the privilege to scout others, though users caught scouting other users who regularly break the site's terms of service and/or guidelines ("abusing the system") get unscouted themselves.

Content and context are liable to be reported for review to the moderators and staff members by flagging it for violations to the site's guidelines. A weighted system recognizes experienced users and gives their flag more voice. Newgrounds' homepage includes featured submissions from each category, as well as awards and honors to users whose submission that fall under the site's requirements to earn them. Members of Newgrounds also organize animations called "collabs" through the discussion forum on the site. Some scholars noted that while hundreds of these "collabs" are produced every year, only 20% are completed due to stress on those making the animations, while other scholars said that animators maintain a "strong sense" of authorship and ownership of what they produce, especially solo animators. 

Although the site hosted animations about Osama bin Laden, Saddam Hussein, and the Taliban, some scholars argued that the site has had a "relatively balanced" conversation on politics, even though those with right-wing views reflect a "sizable part" of the site's user base.

History

In 1991, at the age 13, Tom Fulp launched a Neo Geo fanzine called New Ground and sent issues to approximately 100 members of a club originating on the online service Prodigy. Using a hosting service, he launched a website called New Ground Remix in 1995, which increased in popularity during the summer of 1996 after Fulp created the BBS games Club a Seal and Assassin while a student at Drexel University. He then created Club a Seal II and Assassin II, along with a separate hosting site titled New Ground Atomix. The 1999 release of Pico's School, a Flash browser game that "exhibited a complexity of design and polish in presentation that was virtually unseen in amateur Flash game development" of the time helped establish Newgrounds as a "public force."

While Macromedia Flash Player was required for Newgrounds in order to play specific games, the site also brought together members who were interested in producing Flash games and gained "considerable online influence" as a result. It subsequently became one of the most "active Flash creator communities in the English-speaking Internet" and served as a place that game developers could begin their careers. Flash was once described by Newgrounds as the "driving force" behind the site. Even so, those on the site had a "low tolerance for poor quality work", referring mainly to humor and storytelling instead of animation quality. Some animators on the site moved to YouTube by the mid-2000s.

By November 2008, Newgrounds had over 1.5 million users and over 130,000 animations. This had increased by August 2010, when it was reported that the site had over 2.2 million users and over 180,000 games and animated films, most of which were animations made by only one person, with others collaboratively made by various individuals. It was also said in 2013 that users had created "hundreds of thousands of animated movies and online games".

Time ranked the website at No. 39 on its list of "50 Best Websites" in 2010.

In 2018, Newgrounds began to encourage contributors to submit their games in an HTML5 format rather than Flash. In November and December, it experienced surges of new members originally from Tumblr when that site began restricting adult content after illegal child pornography was found on it, resulting in the Tumblr iOS app being removed from the App Store.

In summer 2019, the administration of Newgrounds unveiled the Newgrounds Player, which has been described as a "solution for playing Flash games and movies" hosted on the site.

In April 2021, an additional week for the browser game Friday Night Funkin' was exclusively released on Newgrounds at the time, causing the site's server to become overloaded after an influx of site traffic.

In July 2021, Fulp received the Game Developers Choice Awards Pioneer Award for his contributions to establishing Newgrounds and subsequent work in The Behemoth.

See also

Internet art
History of the Internet
List of video game websites

References

Citations

Sources
 
 
 

American entertainment websites
Browser-based game websites
Cheltenham Township, Pennsylvania
Flash games
Free music download websites
Internet forums
Internet properties established in 1995